Diggory or Digory may refer to:

People
 Sylvia Farnham-Diggory (born 1927), American author on psychology and disabled people.
 Sylvia Beckingham née Diggory (1935-2006), the first National Health Service UK patient.
 Terence Diggory (born 1950), American professor, editor, poet and author.
 Diggory Dyer Listed as working in the Kitchen and Scullery of in 'A Catalogue of the Household and Family of Richard, Earl of Dorset, 1613- 1624 in Knole, Kent

Fictional characters

As given name
Diggory
Diggory Compton, a fictional character from Coronation Street
Diggory Venn, a fictional character from Thomas Hardy's Return of the Native (1878)
Digory
Digory Kirke, a fictional character from The Chronicles of Narnia

As family name
Cedric Diggory, a fictional character from the Harry Potter series
 Amos Diggory, Cedric's father

Others
 Diggory Press, a publish-on-demand business.